Telecommunications in Turkey provides information about television, radio, fixed and mobile telephones, and the Internet in Turkey.

Telecommunications liberalisation

The telecommunications liberalisation process started in Turkey in 2004 after the creation of the Telecommunication Authority, and is still ongoing as of May 2013.  Private sector companies operate in mobile telephony, long distance telephony and Internet access.  There were 12.3 million (12.300.390) fixed phone lines, 82.2 million (82.795.432) mobile phone subscribers, and 80.9 million broadband subscribers (10.6 million xDSL, 3.8 million Fibre, 1.2 million Cable, 65 million Mobile) by Q3 2020.

Telecommunications liberalisation in Turkey is progressing, but at a slow pace.  The Telecommunication Authority (now renamed Bilgi İletişim ve Teknolojileri Kurumu or BTK), while technically an independent organization, is still controlled by the Ministry of Transport and Communications.

While progress is being made (for example, local as well as long distance calls are now open to competition), the incumbent has so far managed in many areas to restrict access and protect its monopoly.  For example, wholesale line rental is still not available to alternative operators, making it necessary for subscribers to pay two bills (one for line rental to the incumbent, and one to the chosen operator). The incumbent has so far managed to prevent any operator from connecting its own fiber optic cable at local loop unbundling exchanges, though it is technically required to allow this.  Recently, the incumbent announced it is acquiring Invitel, one of only two other players in the inter-city capacity business, raising questions as to how the Turkish Competition Board will treat the acquisition.

The lack of progress by the BTK in ensuring a competitive playing field can be evidenced by the market share the incumbent still holds.  In broadband, the incumbent's provider still occupies roughly 95% share of the market.  The Governmental Audit Office of the President (T.C. Cumhurbaşkanlığı Devlet Denetleme Kurulu) issued a highly critical report of the BTK in February 2010, listing 115 findings to be addressed.  For example, the report found #20 points out that the BTK has completed only 50% to 78% of its stated work plans in each of the years from 2005-2008.

Alternative operators are rapidly growing, yet much progress needs to be made by the BTK to improve the competitive landscape.

Authorities

The political authority is Ministry of Transport, Maritime and Communication (Turkey) . But there are also two supreme councils; Radio and Television Supreme Council (abbreviated RTÜK) and Information and Communication Technologies Authority (abbreviated BTK). While internet and point to point telecommunication is controlled by BTK, radio and television broadcast is controlled by RTÜK.

Apple 

President Recep Tayyip Erdogan has publicly used an iPhone, including famously reaching out to his supporters via FaceTime during the 2016 Turkish coup d'état attempt. In 2018 Erdogan called for a boycott of American electronics in what The Washington Post called a "a feud with the Trump administration" over the detention of American evangelical pastor Andrew Brunson that coincided with the 2018–2021 Turkish currency and debt crisis.

Erdogan noted Samsung and the Turkish Vestel Venus phone as alternative to the US made iPhone. The Vestel Venus retailed from $99 in 2018. Some Vestel phones already use the Taiwanese MediaTek chip, but others use semiconductors made by American company Qualcomm. The phones also use the Android operating system. After the announcement Vestel shares rose on the Istanbul stock exchange. 

According to Bloomberg News, Vestel's market share in Turkey was around 6% at the end of 2016, while Apple sold over 200 million iPhones in 2017. Mashable reported that "Turkey relies on Apple more than Apple relies on Turkey". According to Mashable, Apples market share stood in Turkey around 17.41, while Vestel's was much lower, around 2.08% and that "there are more than 8.5 times more iPhone users worldwide than there are people in Turkey."

According to Bloomberg News, the Vestel Venus phones "aren't among Apple's global rivals". After Erdogan's announcement, the company's valuation reached $450 million, compared to Apple's valuation around $1 trillion.

Made in Turkey mobile devices 
In January 2021 Daily Sabah reported that Samsung had started local manufacture a line of mobile phones in Turkey. Samsung is the leader of the Turkish mobile market with 40% market share. Chinese firm Oppo released their first Made in Turkey smartphone in March 2021 with a retail price around $346. The phone has 64 GB storage, microSD support, 6.5" display and a MediaTek Helio P35 chipset.

See also

 HSTR LAN
 Media in Turkey
 Internet in Turkey
 List of radio stations in Turkey
 Radio and television technology in Turkey
 Telephone numbers in Turkey
 Television in Turkey
 Timeline of broadcasting in Turkey
 List of countries by number of mobile phones in use Turkey, 19th
 List of countries by smartphone penetration Turkey, 11st
 List of countries by number of telephone lines in use Turkey, 17th
 List of mobile network operators of Europe Turkey, 5th

References

External links
 CIA World Factbook - Turkey
 The BTK - The Turkish Telecoms Authority
 TELKODER - the Turkish Alternative Operators Association